Diego de Gorospe y Irala, O.P.  (1649–1715) was a Roman Catholic prelate who served as Bishop of Nueva Segovia (1699–1715).

Biography
Diego de Gorospe y Irala was born in Puebla, México in 1649 and ordained a priest in the Order of Preachers.
On 1 June 1699, he was appointed during the papacy of Pope Innocent XII as Bishop of Nueva Segovia but did not arrive to the diocese until 1704. His appointment filled a long vacancy in the bishopric as his predecessor died in 1683.

On 22 January 1702, he was consecrated bishop by García Felipe de Legazpi y Velasco Altamirano y Albornoz, Bishop of Michoacán. 
He served as Bishop of Nueva Segovia until his death on 20 May 1715.

References 

17th-century Roman Catholic bishops in the Philippines
Bishops appointed by Pope Innocent XII
1649 births
1715 deaths
Dominican bishops
Roman Catholic bishops of Nueva Segovia